Mary Jane Guthrie (December 13, 1895 – February 22, 1975) was an American zoologist and cytologist known for her studies of cytoplasm in reproductive and endocrine cells.

Early life and education
Guthrie was born in New Bloomfield, Missouri.  She graduated from the University of Missouri with a bachelor's degree in 1916 and a master's degree in 1918, then earned her Ph.D. in zoology at Bryn Mawr College in 1922. While working towards her Ph.D., Guthrie served as a zoology instructor and demonstrator.

Career and research 
Returning to Missouri after earning her Ph.D., Guthrie spent the majority of her career at her alma mater, becoming an assistant professor in 1922, associate professor in 1927, and full professor in 1937. Guthrie was known for her writing about zoology; she wrote several textbooks on the subject that were widely used. Guthrie left the University of Missouri for Wayne State University in Detroit in 1950, and stayed there until her 1960 retirement; in 1951 she was given a concurrent appointment at the Detroit Institute for Cancer Research. She cultured ovarian tissue in vitro, a significant achievement at the time, and used her cultures to study ovarian cancer.

Despite her success, Guthrie was denied funding because of her gender, including one instance where she was not funded by the Rockefeller Foundation.

Honors and awards 
Professional memberships:
 American Society of Zoologists
 American Association of Anatomists
 Genetics Society of America
 American Association of Mammalogists
 Tissue Culture Association
Fellowships and awards:
 Fellow, American Association for the Advancement of Science
 Fellow, American Society of Naturalists
 Editor, Journal of Morphology (1944-1947)

Works
General Zoology, John Wiley & Sons Incorporated, 1963
Zoology, Wiley, 1957
Laboratory Directions in General Zoölogy, BiblioBazaar, 2011,

References

External links
Radcliffe "Women in Science" Exhibit, (1936). Records, 1935-1940: A Finding Aid

1895 births
1975 deaths
20th-century American zoologists
20th-century American women scientists
Cell biologists
People from Callaway County, Missouri
University of Missouri alumni
Bryn Mawr College alumni
Wayne State University faculty
University of Missouri faculty
Cancer researchers
American women academics